The psychrometric constant  relates the partial pressure of water in air to the air temperature.  This lets one interpolate actual vapor pressure from paired dry and wet thermometer bulb temperature  readings.

 psychrometric constant [kPa °C−1],

 P = atmospheric pressure [kPa],

 latent heat of water vaporization, 2.45 [MJ kg−1],

 specific heat of air at constant pressure, [MJ kg−1 °C−1],

 ratio molecular weight of water vapor/dry air = 0.622.

Since atmospheric pressure, P,  depends upon altitude, so does .
At higher altitude water evaporates and boils at lower temperature.

Although  is constant, varied air composition results in varied .

Thus on average, at a given location or altitude, the psychrometric constant is approximately constant.  Still, it is worth remembering that weather impacts both atmospheric pressure and composition.

Vapor Pressure Estimation 
Saturated vapor pressure, 
Actual vapor pressure,   

 here e[T]  is vapor pressure as a function of temperature, T.
Tdew = the dewpoint temperature at which water condenses.
Twet = the temperature of a wet thermometer bulb from which water can evaporate to air.
Tdry = the temperature of a dry thermometer bulb in air.

References

Chemical properties
Gas laws
Chemical engineering thermodynamics
Physical chemistry
Gases
Underwater diving physics